Titanium bis(acetylacetonate)dichloride is the coordination complex with the formula Ti(C5H7O2)2Cl2.  It is a common acetylacetonate complex of titanium.  It is a red-orange solid that hydrolyzes slowly in air.

The complex is prepared by treatment of titanium tetrachloride with excess acetylacetone:
TiCl4 + 2 Hacac → Ti(acac)2Cl2 + 2 HCl

It is an octahedral complex that crystallizes as a racemic mixture of the chiral cis isomers. It is fluxional in solution, as the result of rapid cis–trans equilibrium.

References

Titanium compounds
Acetylacetonate complexes